Gamma Doradus variables are variable stars which display variations in luminosity due to non-radial pulsations of their surface.  The stars are typically young, early F or late A type main sequence stars, and typical brightness fluctuations are 0.1 magnitudes with periods on the order of one day.  This class of variable stars is relatively new, having been first characterized in the second half of the 1990s, and details on the underlying physical cause of the variations remains under investigation.

The star 9 Aurigae was first noticed to be variable in 1990. However, none of the currently-accepted explanations were adequate: it pulsated too slowly and was outside of the Delta Scuti instability strip, and there was no evidence for any eclipsing material, although Gamma Doradus and HD 96008 were noted to be similar. These three stars, as well as HD 224638, were soon hypothesized to belong to a new class of variable stars in which variability was produced by g-mode pulsations rather than the p-mode pulsations of Delta Scuti variables. HD 224945 and HD 164615 were noticed to be similar as well, while HD 96008 was ruled out on the basis of its more regular period. Eclipses and starspots were soon ruled out as the cause of the Gamma Doradus' variability, and the variability of 9 Aurigae was confirmed to be caused by g-mode pulsations a year later, thus confirming the stars as the prototypes of a new class of variable stars. Over ten more candidates were quickly found, and the discoverers dubbed the group the Gamma Doradus stars, after the brightest member and the first member found to be variable.

List

References